Left of Self-Centered is Butch Walker's debut album, released on July 9, 2002 on BMG/Arista Records.

Track listing
All songs written by Butch Walker.
"Rock Vocal Power" – 1:56
"My Way" – 4:00
"Suburbia" – 4:07
"Trouble" – 3:58
"Alicia Amnesia" – 3:42
"Sober" – 3:20
"Into the Black" – 3:38
"Get Down" – 4:03
"Far Away from Close" – 3:52
"Diary of a San Fernando Sexx Star" – 3:39
"If (Jeannie's Song)" – 4:53
"Take Tomorrow (One Day at a Time)" – 4:30
"Get Stupid with You" (hidden track) – 4:58

Bonus track
The Japanese release of the album featured a "Queen Medley", recorded live in Atlanta, Georgia, as a bonus track. The song was later released in the United States on Walker's Cover Me Badd EP (2005).

Personnel
Kenny Cresswell – drums, backing vocals
Jim Ebert – moog synth, keyboards
Greg Lee – bass
Chrystina Lloree – backing vocals
Matt Mahaffey – beats, keys, gratuitous hip-hop style scratching
Mitch "Slug" McLee – drums
Peter Searcy – cello
Harold Sellers – congas
Nikki Sixx – bass
Butch Walker – vocals, guitar, bass, piano, programming, keyboards, percussion

References

2002 debut albums
Butch Walker albums
Arista Records albums